Carennac is a commune in the Lot department in south-western France in the historical region of Quercy.

The village lies in the fertile valley of the Dordogne under the arid plateau locally named 'le Causse'. Its landmarks include a medieval priory, combining an 11th-century church and cloister, and a 16th-century castle, in which the author of The Adventures of Telemachus, François Fénelon, lived from 1681 to 1685. The church features a tympanum, and the cloister a 15th-century "mise au tombeau".

Activities
Carennac is one of the most beautiful villages of France (along with 148 others, including neighbouring Loubressac, Autoire, Curemonte and Turenne). The summer months are warm and dry, with temperatures averaging 30°.

Surroundings and access
A few kilometres from the village are the Gouffre de Padirac (caves) and Rocamadour (pilgrimage) sites. Other landmarks are the Château de Castelnau-Bretenoux, the Castle of Montal and the prehistoric caves of Lacave and Presque. Further on, Sarlat-la-Canéda, Brive-la-Gaillarde, Cahors and Aurillac are regional hubs.

See also
Communes of the Lot department
 In writing: At Home in France by Ann Barry.
 On film: French TV drama La Rivière Espérance (1997), shot in Carennac and depicting the changes brought about by the introduction of railroad in the 19th century.

References

External links

 Official website

Communes of Lot (department)
Plus Beaux Villages de France